Athanasia Pouridou (born 22 January 1975) is a Greek former footballer who played as a defender.

Pouridou was part of the Greece women's national football team  at the 2004 Summer Olympics. On club level she played for Kavala 86.

See also
 Greece at the 2004 Summer Olympics

References

External links
 
 
 
 sport.de

1975 births
Living people
Place of birth missing (living people)
Greek women's footballers
Women's association football defenders
Greece women's international footballers
Olympic footballers of Greece
Footballers at the 2004 Summer Olympics